Yoo Ara (born September 26, 1992) is a South Korean singer and actress, known for her work as a former member of the South Korean girl group Hello Venus.

Career

Pre-debut

Ara was part of a training program, called 'Pre-School Girls', that would eventually become a member of sister group After School, but was chosen to be the leader of Hello Venus instead. She sang the chorus for the 1st Happy Pledis single, “Love Love Love”. She also sang and appeared in the music video "Love Letter".

Yoo Ara, along with fellow Pledis trainee Kyung Min were the final two candidates to me2day Search for After School's 9th Member in 2010. Ara and along with Hello Venus members, Yoonjo were originally in the line-up for After School however, current After School member E-Young was chosen instead.

2012: Debut
Ara debuted on May 9, 2012, actively promoting Hello Venus's debut release, the mini-album 'Venus'. 'Venus' features four tracks in all, with "Venus" serving as the promotional track.

Promotions for "Venus" began on May 10, 2012, on M! Countdown, without Yoonjo.

On July 4, 2012, together with the group, they released "Like a Wave", off the digital album 'Like a Wave (Digital Repackage)'.

2014: Departure from Hello Venus and Pledis
Yoo Ara was featured in label mate SEVENTEEN's Remix of the song "A Midsummer Night's Sweetness" by Raina and San E, the remix being released on July 27.

Four days later, an official statement was posted stating that Pledis and Fantagio had decided to end their collaboration project: Hello Venus. Yoo Ara and Yoonjo, Pledis' contributions, would be leaving the group, and the rest would stay as a Fantagio act.

On November 21, Yoo Ara uploaded a video to Instagram, showing her with a guitar case and a bag, walking out of a building. It has since been deleted. Later that day, Urban Works Entertainment uploaded a profile for Yoo Ara on their website, showing that Yoo Ara had departed from Pledis. Ara's signing with Urban Works was formally announced on December 1.

2015: Musical debut
On February 11, it was revealed that Yoo Ara would be cast as the female lead in the Japanese musical remake of Moon Embracing the Sun. The musical will open its curtains at Theater BRAVA in Osaka on the 20th, as well as U-Port Hall in Tokyo in April.

On August 5, 2015, Urban Works announced that Yoo Ara will be acting in The Alchemist as Yoo Jin Ah, Oh Young Ji's best friend and roommate, played by Kara's Youngji.

2016: Departure from Urban Works 
In 2016, Yoo Ara departed from Urban Works.

Personal life
Ara went to Seoul Music High School, the same school as SHINee’s Jonghyun, Block B’s Zico and Boyfriend’s Jeongmin. She graduated on February 19, 2010, two years earlier than usual.

Discography

Collaborations

Filmography

TV drama

TV Show

Awards

References

External links

Hello Venus' Official Homepage

1992 births
Living people
Fantagio artists
Hello Venus members
Pledis Entertainment artists
South Korean dance musicians
South Korean female dancers
South Korean women pop singers
South Korean film actresses
South Korean female idols
South Korean television actresses
South Korean television personalities
21st-century South Korean singers
21st-century South Korean women singers
People from Pyeongtaek